Eucalyptus albopurpurea, commonly known as the purple-flowered mallee box or Port Lincoln mallee, is a mallee or sometimes a tree that is endemic to South Australia. It has loose, fibrous grey-brown bark on the lower park of the trunk and smooth grey bark that is shed in strips on its upper parts. The leaves are lance-shaped to egg-shaped, the flower buds are spindle-shaped to club-shaped and the flowers are white, pink, mauve or purple. Flowering can occur in most months and the fruit are cup-shaped or barrel-shaped capsules.

Description
It has rough, loose, fibrous bark on the lower part of the trunk and smooth coppery to pinkish grey bark that is shed in strips higher up. The adult leaves are the same glossy, dark green colour on both sides. The operculum is conical to rounded. White, pink, mauve or purple flowers appear in most months.

Taxonomy and naming
The purple-flowered mallee box was first formally described in 1974 by Clifford David Boomsma who gave it the name Eucalyptus lansdowneana subsp. albopurpurea and published the description in the South Australian Naturalist from a specimen collected by Reginald Allan Dorward. In 2000, Dean Nicolle raised it to species status as Eucalyptus albopurpurea. The specific epithet (albopurpurea) is derived from the Latin words albus meaning "white" and purpureus meaning "purple", referring to the variation in the flower colour.

Distribution and habitat
Eucalyptus albopurpurea is only known from Kangaroo Island and the southern tip of the Eyre Peninsula where it grows on sandhills near the ocean and around seasonally wet areas.

References

albopurpurea
Myrtales of Australia
Trees of Australia
Flora of South Australia
Plants described in 2000